Laura Dutertre (born 13 October 1988 in Digne-les-Bains, France) is a French figure skater. She is the 2005–2007 French national bronze medalist.

See also
French Figure Skating Championships

References

External links
 

French female single skaters
1988 births
Living people
People from Digne-les-Bains
Sportspeople from Alpes-de-Haute-Provence
21st-century French women